The men's 400 + 600 + 800 + 1000 metres medley relay event at the 1970 European Athletics Indoor Championships was held on 15 March in Vienna. The first athlete ran two laps of the 200-metre track, the second three, the third four and the anchor five, thus 14 laps or 2800 metres in total.

Results

Heats
First 2 teams in each heat (Q) qualified directly for the final.

Final

References

4 × 400 metres relay at the European Athletics Indoor Championships
Relay